Penelope Carwardine (1729–1804; married name Penelope Butler) was an English miniature painter.

Life
Penelope Carwardine was baptised on 29 April 1729 at Withington, Herefordshire, England. She was one of eight children born to John Carwardine of Thinghills Court and his wife, Anne Bullock of Preston Wynn. With her father having ruined the family estates, Carwardine took to miniature painting to generate an income for the family. According to the Dictionary of National Biography and other sources, she was instructed by Ozias Humphrey, and mastered the art in 1754. However, Humphrey was not born until 1742, and it must be considered whether historical sources have at some point been confused and that the teaching was in fact the other way round. Her mother was also a miniature painter, and the two of them exhibited miniatures at the Incorporated Society of Artists in London in 1761 and 1762 under the name "Mrs Thomas Carwardine (Anne)." Carwardine went on to exhibit there in 1771 and 1772. On 26 May 1973, she married James Butler, the organist at the Church of St. Margaret's, Westminster, at the Church of St. James Piccadilly in London.

Carwardine belonged to the Modest School of English miniaturists, a group that also included Peter Paul Lens and Gervase Spencer. The majority of her miniatures date between 1750 and 1785–90 and are usually signed PC.

Carwardine died on 14 October 1805 and was buried at Preston Wynne, Herefordshire.

She was a close friend of both Joshua Reynolds and Frances Reynolds; and among Sir Joshua's works is a portrait of one of her sisters, painted by him as a present for her. Many of her miniatures remained in the possession of her family as of 1887, together with three portraits of Carwardine: one by Thomas Bardwell, 1750; one by a Chinese artist, about 1756; the third by George Romney, about 1790.

Notes

References 

1729 births
1804 deaths
18th-century English painters
18th-century English women artists
English portrait painters
English women painters
People from Herefordshire
Portrait miniaturists
Year of birth uncertain